The Monk (Le Moine) is a 1972 French-German-Italian-Belgian gothic horror-drama film directed by Ado Kyrou. It is based on the 1796 eponymous novel written by Matthew Gregory Lewis.

Cast 
 Franco Nero: Ambrosio
 Nathalie Delon: Mathilde
 Nadja Tiller: Elvira
 Élisabeth Wiener: Agnès
 Eliana De Santis: Antonia
 Nicol Williamson: Duke of Talamur
 Agnès Capri
 Maria Machado

References

External links

1972 films
1972 horror films
1972 drama films
Belgian horror drama films
French horror drama films
Italian horror films
West German films
Films based on British novels
1970s French-language films
English-language Belgian films
English-language French films
English-language German films
English-language Italian films
Films scored by Piero Piccioni
Gothic horror films
German horror films
1970s Italian films
1970s French films
1970s German films